The  is a wholesale market in Tokyo, located in the Toyosu area of the Kōtō ward. There are two markets for seafood, one for general wholesale and one for bidding, and one market for fruits and vegetables, with each in its own building. Tourists can observe the auction market on a second floor viewing deck. There are restaurants with fresh seafood and produce from the market and shops (魚河岸横丁 uogashi yokocho). The market is built on reclaimed land in Tokyo Bay, and replaces the historic Tsukiji fish market, which now is a major tourist attraction. Auction tours, events, merchandise sales and restaurants can be used by general consumers and tourists. When it opened on 11 October 2018, it became the largest wholesale fish market in the world.

History 
The old Tsukiji fish market occupied valuable real estate close to the center of the city. Former Tokyo Governor Shintaro Ishihara repeatedly called for moving the market to Toyosu, Koto. The new Toyosu Market cost $5 billion to build. The long-anticipated move to the new market was scheduled to take place in November 2016, in preparation for the 2020 Summer Olympics, but on August 31, 2016, the move was postponed. There had been concerns that the new location was heavily polluted and needed to be cleaned up, and toxic substances were discovered in the soil and groundwater at Toyosu, due to the gas plant that was previously located on the property. The Tokyo Metropolitan Government spent an additional 3.8 billion yen ($33.5 million) to pump out groundwater by digging hundreds of wells. In June 2017, plans to move the fish market were restarted, but delayed in July to the autumn of 2018. After the new site was declared safe following a cleanup operation, the opening date of the new market was set for 11 October 2018. The grand opening was on 11 October 2018. It opened to the general public on 13 October 2018.

In Tsukiji there are plans to retain a retail market, roughly a quarter of the current operation, and the remaining area of the market will be redeveloped.

During the first auction of Toyosu Market on January 5, 2019, businessman Kiyoshi Kimura, president of Kiyomura Corp which operates the Sushi-Zanmai chain, paid a record highest bid of 333.6 million yen ($3.08 million) for a 278 kilogram (612 pound) Pacific bluefin tuna. The next year, again on 5 January, Kimura paid 193.2 million yen ($1.79 million) for a 276 kilogram bluefin tuna. This tuna was caught near Ōma, Aomori Prefecture.

Facility
There are 3 markets: a wholesale market for consumers, an auction market, and a fruit and vegetable market. There are about 40 food stalls in the wholesale fish buildings, most of which are located above the market, and accessible to visitors. The new complex also includes a large rooftop terrace with lawns. Nikken Sekkei designed the Fishery Naka Wholesale Building, Fishery Wholesale Building, and Fruit and Vegetable Building. At , Toyosu Market is almost twice the size of the old Tsukiji fish market.

Unlike the previous Tsukiji fish market, the public cannot attend the auction at floor level among buyers. Instead, visitors can watch the market from a second floor viewing deck or, upon registration, from a room at the same level separated from the auction by a window. There is a shrine titled Uogashi Suijinja (shrine for a fish market on the shore) at the corner of the Toyosu buildings near the waterfront. The rooftop, accessible by elevator, includes a terrace with landscaping and panoramic views of parts of Tokyo's skyline. Eating or drinking are not allowed on the roof.

Access
Toyosu Market is located at 6 Chome-3 Toyosu, Kōtō ward, Tokyo 135-0061, Japan. It is open to the public.

Gallery

See also 
Tsukiji fish market (former location)

References 

Fish markets
Fishing industry in Japan
Buildings and structures in Koto, Tokyo
Commercial buildings completed in 2018
2018 establishments in Japan